Armand Gérard Gaudreault (July 14, 1921 – July 2, 2013) was a Canadian ice hockey player. He played 44 games in the National Hockey League with the Boston Bruins during the 1944–45 season. The rest of his career, which lasted from 1940 to 1952, was spent in the Quebec Senior Hockey League and the American Hockey League. Gaudreault was born in Lac Saint-Jean, Quebec.

Playing career
Gaudreault began his professional career with the Quebec Aces of the Quebec Senior Hockey League in 1940. In 1944, he signed with the Boston Bruins of the National Hockey League and played 44 games, scoring 15 goals and 24 points in his one and only season in the NHL. Afterwards he had two highly productive seasons with the American Hockey League's Hershey Bears, with 21 and 23 goals in respective seasons. He would eventually return to the Aces in 1949 and would remain with the team until his retirement in 1952.

Later life
He died in Quebec City on July 2, 2013 at the age of 91.

Career statistics

Regular season and playoffs

References

External links

1921 births
2013 deaths
People from Saguenay–Lac-Saint-Jean
Boston Bruins players
Canadian ice hockey left wingers
Hershey Bears players
Ice hockey people from Quebec
Quebec Aces (QSHL) players